Peter Hansen House may refer to:

Peter Hansen House (Pierre, South Dakota), listed on the National Register of Historic Places (NRHP) in Hughes County
Peter Hansen House (Manti, Utah), listed on the NRHP in Sanpete County

See also
Hansen House (disambiguation)